Tangerang Station is a railway station located in the city of Tangerang, Banten. It is the western terminus of the Duri–Tangerang railway. This station only serves commuter trains operated by Kereta Commuter Indonesia. Passengers are mainly commuters going from the suburbs in Tangerang to Jakarta.

History 
Staatsspoorwegen built a branch line from Duri Station to Tangerang Station via Staatblad No.  180 dated July 5, 1896 to transport agricultural products, military needs, and passengers. The station along with the 19 km line was inaugurated on January 2, 1899.

In 1935, it was recorded that every day there were 12 train operations at this station, and vice versa with the same number of trips. The Duri-Tangerang train is available in two circuits, namely a special class 3 circuit and a mixed class between classes 2 and 3. Class 2 is intended for foreigners, Chinese and indigenous businessmen while class 3 is for indigenous people.

Most of the goods transported are agricultural products. The private lands previously managed by Chinese businessmen were planted with rice, peanuts, cassava, indigo, coconut and various types of vegetables. In addition to agricultural products, goods transported by train are household handicrafts. The most widely done craft is weaving hats from bamboo. The results of the hats were bought by the Chinese and Europeans. Most of the Chinese resold the bamboo hats they bought, while the Europeans sent them overseas via the Port of Tanjung Priok.

Building and layout 
This station has 4 train lines, with lines 1 and 2 being a straight line towards Tanah Tinggi. Right next to line 4 there is a KRL subdepot to store facilities.

In the past, Tangerang Station had a branch towards the Cisadane River, the branch line is believed to have been before the Pasar Anyar crossing but now there is no trace of it. This branch was used for the transportation of materials from the Cisadane River for the construction of Gelora Bung Karno Sports Complex in 1960–1962. It is said that the C300 locomotive took part in the process of delivering materials for the construction of GBK. This rail is adjacent to the Tangerang City Sports Hall, along Jalan Kampung Sukamulya, Babakan Ujung.

Services
The following is a list of train services at the Poris Station.

Passenger services 
 KAI Commuter
  Tangerang Line, to

Supporting transportation

Controversy 

 On July 19, 2016, there was a closure of access to enter Tangerang Station by the Tangerang City Government. Passengers were then diverted through the east station entrance. As a result, Tangerang residents have difficulty on accessing the station because they have to walk far from the station entrance towards Jalan Kisamaun. This is because the entrance to the station was closed because it unraveled the chaos of angkots waiting for passengers at Tangerang Station.

References

External links

Tangerang
Railway stations in Banten
Railway stations opened in 1899